Chaparral High School is a public secondary school in rural Harper County, Kansas, United States, and located approximately halfway between the cities of Anthony and Harper.  The school is operated by Chaparral USD 361 school district, and serves students of grades 7 to 12.

Overview
The school was established in 1971.

Students
Chaparral High School made Adequate Yearly Progress (AYP) in 2009. (Under No Child Left Behind, a school makes AYP if it achieves the minimum levels of improvement determined by the state of Kansas in terms of student performance and other accountability measures.)

In 2008, Chaparral High School had 13 students for every full-time equivalent teacher. The Kansas average is 13 students per full-time equivalent teacher. The Anthony-Harper School District spends $11,031 per pupil in current expenditures. The district spends 59% on instruction, 36% on support services, 5% on other elementary and secondary expenditures.

As of 2011 there are 273 students enrolled at this high school with 90% being white, 4% being Hispanic, 1% being African-American, 3% being Asian, and 2% being American Indian.

Extracurricular activities
Chaparral High School also offers various extracurricular activities other than athletics including: Chess team, Debate and Forensics, Distinguished Graduates, Future Business Leaders of America, Fellowship of Christian Athletes, Future Farmers of America, Key Club, National Honor Society, Pep Club, Roadrunner Bands, Student Counsel, Teens as Teachers, Scholars Bowl, and Technology Student Association.

See also

 List of high schools in Kansas
 List of unified school districts in Kansas

References

External links
 School Website
 USD 361
 USD 361 School District Boundary Map, KDOT

Schools in Harper County, Kansas
Public high schools in Kansas
1971 establishments in Kansas